The gendarme to stroll is the fourth instalment of the gendarme series starring Louis de Funès and also known as "The Gendarme Takes Off" and "The Troops on Vacation". It is followed by two more films: Le gendarme et les extra-terrestres and Le gendarme et les gendarmettes.

Plot 
Changes are coming for the Gendarmerie Brigade of Saint Tropez. The gendarmes are forced into retirement to make way for a younger breed. Even so, when they learn that one of them has had an accident and has become amnesiac, they reunite to help him get his memory back. Along the way, they have to stop juvenile delinquents to put a nuclear warhead on a rocket said youths built, while being pursued by their younger colleagues.

Cast
 Louis de Funès : Ludovic Cruchot
 Michel Galabru: Jérôme Gerber
 Claude Gensac: Josépha
 Jean Lefebvre: Fougasse
 Christian Marin: Merlot
 Guy Grosso: Tricard
 Michel Modo: Berlicot
 France Rumilly: Sister Clothilde
 Nicole Vervil: Madame Gerber
 Dominique Davray: The Abbess
 Yves Vincent: The Colonel
 Paul Préboist: The Groom
 Ugo Fangareggi: Hippie

Reception
The film was the most popular at the French box office in 1970 with admissions of 4,870,609.

References

External links 
 
 
Le gendarme en balade at Cinema-français 

1970 films
Italian comedy films
Films shot in Saint-Tropez
French comedy films
1970s French-language films
Films directed by Jean Girault
Films set in Saint-Tropez
1970s police comedy films
1970 comedy films
1970s French films
1970s Italian films